Beyene is a surname. Notable people with the surname include:

Bébéy Beyene (born 1992), Cameroonian footballer
Beraki Beyene (born 1980), Eritrean long-distance runner
Yidnekachew Beyene (born 1989), Ethiopian footballer
Yonas Beyene, Ethiopian archeologist
Nagasa Beyene (born 1999), Oromo Artist